Țârdenii may refer to one of two places in Romania:

Țârdenii Mari, a village in Blăgești Commune, Bacău County
Țârdenii Mici, a village in Cândești Commune, Neamț County